Lake Sherwood or Sherwood Lake may refer to some places in the United States:
United States
Lake Sherwood, California, a gated community
Lake Sherwood (California), the reservoir around which the community is built
Lake Sherwood (Florida), a lake near Orlando, Florida
Lake Sherwood, Wisconsin, a CDP
Lake Sherwood (Kansas), a lake
Sherwood Lake (Berrien County, Michigan), a lake
Lake Sherwood (West Virginia), a lake in the Monongahela National Forest